The quartet distance is a way of measuring the distance between two phylogenetic trees.  It is defined as the number of subsets of four leaves that are not related by the same topology in both trees.

Computing the quartet distance
The most straightforward computation of the quartet distance would require  time, where  is the number of leaves in the trees.

For binary trees, better algorithms have been found to compute the distance in 
  time
  time
and
  time

Gerth Stølting Brodal et al. found an algorithm that takes  time to compute the quartet distance between two multifurcating trees when  is the maximum degree of the trees,  which is accessible in C, perl, and the R package Quartet.

References

Computational phylogenetics
Bioinformatics algorithms